San Juan Diego Catholic High School (SJDCHS) is a private, Roman Catholic high school in Austin, Texas.  It is located in the Roman Catholic Diocese of Austin.

Background
In August 2002, Archbishop Gregory M. Aymond opened San Juan Diego Catholic High School. San Juan Diego is modeled after Cristo Rey Jesuit High School in Chicago.

Each student at San Juan Diego works toward a Distinguished Achievement diploma, which includes 30 credits and 80 hours of community service.

Location
The school is located on the campus of San Jose Catholic Church in central Austin, near the intersection of Oltorf and South First Streets.

Notes and references

External links

 Roman Catholic Diocese of Austin
 School Website

Catholic secondary schools in Texas
Holy Cross secondary schools
Educational institutions established in 2002
High schools in Austin, Texas
2002 establishments in Texas